Zapper may refer to:

 Automated sales suppression device or zapper, software for falsifying cash register records
 NES Zapper, a pistol-shaped electronic light gun sold as part of the original Nintendo Entertainment System
 Wii Zapper, a gun-shaped electronic light gun sold as an accessory for the Wii
 Parasite Zapper, an electronic device to eliminate pathogens and to cure most of diseases invented and claimed by Hulda Regehr Clark
 Zapper: One Wicked Cricket, a multi-platform video game released in 2002
 Bug zapper, a device that uses a light source to attract insects to an electrical grid, where they are incinerated by the current
 Zapper, a TV ident for BBC Two from 1997 to 2001 
 Zapper, a translated version of a nickname for Mikoto Misaka